The Terengganu State Route T1, or Jalan Merang, is a road connected to the Malaysia Federal Route 3685 and Jalan Tengku Omar. This road is also called "Jalan Pantai".

T1
Roads in Terengganu